The Wall Philippines is a Philippine television game show broadcast by TV5 and GMA Network. The show is based on the American game show The Wall. It is hosted by Billy Crawford.

Series overview

Episodes
Color key
 The contestants won at least ₱1,000,000.
 The contestants left with the larger possible amount.
 The contestants left with the smaller possible amount.
 The contestants left with nothing at all.

Season 1 (TV5)

Season 2 (GMA Network)

References

Lists of Philippine television series episodes